Artem Oleksandrovych Vasko (born 7 June 2000) is a Ukrainian professional footballer who plays as a centre-back.

References

External links
 
 

2000 births
Living people
People from Pershotravensk
Kharkiv State College of Physical Culture 1 alumni
Ukrainian footballers
Association football defenders
FC Zorya Luhansk players
FC Nyva Ternopil players
Ukrainian First League players
Sportspeople from Dnipropetrovsk Oblast